Dendrogale is a genus of treeshrew in the family Tupaiidae found in Southeast Asia and Borneo.  It contains these species:
 Bornean smooth-tailed treeshrew (D. melanura)
 Northern smooth-tailed treeshrew (D. murina)

References

Treeshrews
Mammal genera
Taxa named by John Edward Gray
Taxonomy articles created by Polbot